Pammene agnotana is a species of butterfly belonging to the family Tortricidae.

It is native to Europe.

References

Tortricidae